"Over You" is a song by English rock band Roxy Music which was released as the lead single from their album Flesh and Blood. "Over You" entered the UK Singles Chart at No.18 before going on to reach a peak of No.5 on June 14, 1980. The song spent a total of nine weeks on the UK Singles Chart, of which seven were in the top 20. Over you was given a silver certification from the BPI in June 1980 for sales of over 200,000 copies in the UK.

Over You was also the third and final single by Roxy Music to chart on the Billboard Hot 100. It entered the Hot 100 at No.84 on August 6, 1980 and peaked at No. 80 the following week.

Phil Manzanera recalls: "In 1979, I had just built my first recording studio and I rang up Bryan and asked if he’d like to check it out. We decided to have a jam together, Bryan on bass and me on guitar with a rhythm box. Within five minutes we had written this track and it reached number three [sic] in the charts."

In most European countries, the B-side release on the single was a re-recording of the title track of their 1979 LP Manifesto.  The new version was a new arrangement with a shorter intro, and the lyrics were broken up into several verses, while the original was continuous. This new version was re-released on the Thrill of It All boxset as Manifesto (Remake).

Personnel

 Bryan Ferry – vocals, keyboards, piano
 Phil Manzanera – guitar, bass
 Andy Mackay – saxophones and oboe
 Allan Schwartzberg – drums

Charts

References

1980 singles
Roxy Music songs
Songs written by Bryan Ferry
Songs written by Phil Manzanera
1980 songs
Atco Records singles
Polydor Records singles
E.G. Records singles